Pivalonitrile is a nitrile with the semi-structural formula (CH3)3CCN, abbreviated t-BuCN.  This aliphatic organic compound is a clear, colourless liquid that is used as a solvent and as a labile ligand in coordination chemistry. Pivalonitrile is isomeric with tert-butyl isocyanide but the two compounds do not exist in chemical equilibrium, unlike its silicon analog trimethylsilyl cyanide.

References

5
Tert-butyl compounds